The 400s decade ran from January 1, 400, to December 31, 409.

Significant people

References